The 1908 Tulane Olive and Blue football team was an American football team that represented Tulane University as an independent during the 1908 college football season. In their second year under head coach Joe Curtis, the team compiled an overall record of 7–1.

Schedule

References

Tulane
Tulane Green Wave football seasons
Tulane Olive and Blue football